Platon Ilarionovych Maiboroda (1 December 1918 in Pelekhivshchyna khutir, Ukrainian State – 8 July 1989 in Kyiv, Soviet Union) was a Soviet composer.

Maiboroda, whose brother Heorhiy Maiboroda was also a composer, studied at the Gliere Music College. In 1938 Maiboroda enrolled in the Kyiv Conservatory in Kyiv where he studied under Levko Revutsky, graduating in 1947. Maiboroda taught at the Gliere Music College from 1947 to 1950.

He was buried at the Baikove Cemetery, Kyiv.

Works

Films
 Valley of Blue Rocks (1956)
 Far and Near (1957)
 Thunder over fields (1958)
 Shift starts at six (1958)
 Ages of youth (1958), director Oleksiy Mishurin
 Odessa (1959)
 Blood of Man - Not a Water (1960)
 Dmytro Horytsvit (1961)
 Ukrainian Rhapsody (1961)
 People don't know everything (1964)
 Ballad of British (1969)
 Abiturient (1973)
 Adieu, pharaohs! (1975)
 Ordinary concern (1975)
 Involuntary diplomats (1978)
 Revision (1979)
 Visit to Kovalivka (1980)

Selected songs
 Dearest mother of mine (words of Andriy Malyshko), soundtrack to the film Ages of youth (1958)
 Kyiv Waltz (words of Andriy Malyshko)

Awards
 Stalin Prize (III degree, 1950) - for songs "About Olena Khobta", "About Mark Ozerny", "About Maria Lysenko"
 Shevchenko National Prize (1962)
 Distinguished Artist of Ukrainian SSR (1958)
 National Artist of Ukrainian SSR (1968)
 National Artist of Soviet Union (1979)
 Order of Lenin

Notes

1918 births
1989 deaths
Burials at Baikove Cemetery
Soviet classical composers
Soviet opera composers
People from Poltava Oblast
Recipients of the Shevchenko National Prize
People's Artists of the USSR
Recipients of the title of People's Artists of Ukraine